Michel Augusto Modesto Rafael dos Santos (born 20 May 2003), simply known as Michel, is a Brazilian professional footballer who plays for Palmeiras.

Club career 
Michel made his Serie A debut for Palmeiras on the 1st December 2021, starting the game against Cuiabá, and playing the full 90 minutes of this 3–1 away win.

In a Palmeiras side that had just won its second Copa Libertadores in a row, while already being out of the race for the Serie A season, Michel appeared as one of the most promising prospect of the Paulistas, starting the last three championship games of the season as a central defender in Abel Ferreira's 3-4-3 system.

References

External links

2003 births
Living people
Brazilian footballers
Association football defenders
Sociedade Esportiva Palmeiras players
Campeonato Brasileiro Série A players
Footballers from São Paulo (state)
People from Avaré